The Battle of Karstula was fought between Swedish and Russian troops on August 21, 1808. The Swedish force under Otto von Fieandt was defeated by a much bigger Russian force under Jegor Vlastov. During the battle and retreat the Swedes lost 313 men, the Russians lost 245.

Notes, citations and sources

Notes

Citations

Sources

Julius Mankell. Anteckningar rörande finska arméens och Finlands krigshistoria särskildt med afseende på krigen emellan sverige och ryssland åren 1788-1790 samt 1808-1809, Volume 2. P.A. Norstedt & Söner, 1870. pp. 199–201.
Georg Carl von Döbeln (1856-1878). Några anteckningar om och af general von Döbeln, Volume 2. p. 51

Karstula
Karstula 1808
Karstula
Karstula
Karstula
History of Central Finland
August 1808 events
1808 in Sweden